The Banks Peninsula (sometimes Banks' Peninsula) is located on the mainland of Canada's Nunavut territory. There are no communities on the peninsula, though the hamlet of Bathurst Inlet is located close by, to the south, across the waterway of Bathurst Inlet. The peninsula has an irregular coastline, including a portion bounded by Arctic Sound. Point Wollaston is the northernmost geographic feature.

The peninsula is one of many landforms named in honour of Sir Joseph Banks, President of the Royal Society.

References

External links
 Photo, 1930, Inuit woman wearing caribou skin parka, Banks Peninsula

Peninsulas of Kitikmeot Region